The Barnard River Scheme is an inter-basin water transfer system in New South Wales, which can transfer water from the Barnard River in the upper Manning River catchment over the Mount Royal Range into the Hunter River.

The scheme was constructed between 1983 and 1985, to provide drought relief water for Bayswater Power Station which was being constructed at the same time.

The scheme consists of:

 a weir on the Barnard River, which transfers water into a small dam on Orham Creek via a gravity channel
 a pair of pumping stations which pump the water through pipelines to Bralga Tops
 another pipeline feeding downhill into Oaky Creek, which is a tributary of the Hunter River.

References

External links 
 Macquarie Generation's water supply
 NSW Department of Environment and Climate Change

Interbasin transfer
Irrigation in Australia
Geography of New South Wales